Uisai is a South Bougainville language of Bougainville Province, Papua New Guinea. It is in the Buin language subfamily. The language uses Latin script.

References

Languages of the Autonomous Region of Bougainville
South Bougainville languages